Reach Federal Credit Union (formerly Tyco Federal Credit Union) is a federally chartered credit union for employees of Tyco International, TE Connectivity and Covidien.  Reach Federal Credit Union (Reach CU(TM)) is federally insured and regulated by the National Credit Union Administration (NCUA). Reach Credit Union is headquartered in Menlo Park, California with offices in NC, PA and FL. Like all credit unions, Reach Credit Union is governed by a board of volunteers, elected by and from its membership.

History
Reach Federal Credit Union was founded in 1971 as Raychem Employees' Federal Credit Union by employees of Raychem Corporation.  It was founded as a non-profit financial service cooperative dedicated to helping its members get ahead financially.  After Tyco International acquired Raychem in 1999, it changed its name and expanded its field of membership to include all Tyco International employees. In 2007 Tyco Electronics and Tyco Healthcare were divested from Tyco International. This modified Reach CU's field of membership to include the three separate organizations Tyco International, Tyco Electronics (now TE Connectivity), and  Tyco Healthcare (now Covidien).

By 2013, due to divestitures, mergers and acquisitions by its corporate sponsors, the credit union's field of membership now includes ADT, Atkore, Covidien, Elo Touch Solutions, Mallinckrodt, Pentair, TE Connectivity and Tyco International employees and their families. Since only one of the sponsor companies still has the name Tyco, on August 1, 2013, Tyco Federal Credit Union became Reach Federal Credit Union.

In 2016 Reach Federal Credit Union Merged into Xceed Financial (Federal Credit Union).

Before merging with Reach, Xceed Financial Credit Union was a $900 million credit union with negative earnings for 2015.

Currently Xceed financial is a $915,823,108 asset sized credit union with $1,955,920 in Net Income and a Net Worth Ration of 10.20 (must be above 7.00) as of June 2018.

Products and services
Banking and Mortgage Services

Field of membership
Employees of Tyco International and its subsidiaries and business units (i.e., ADT, SimplexGrinnell, Tracer, Tyco Valves, Tyco Thermal Control, Tyco Electrical and Metal)

Employees of TE Connectivity and its business units (i.e., Elo Touchsystems, Precision Interconnect, Tyco Telecommunication)

Employees of Covidien (formerly Tyco Healthcare) and its business units (i.e., Mallinckrodt, Puritan Bennett)

Immediate family members are eligible to join.

References

External links
 Reach Federal Credit Union
 National Credit Union Administration

Banks established in 1971
Credit unions based in California
Companies based in Menlo Park, California
American companies established in 1971
1971 establishments in California